The Planning Inspectorate for England (sometimes referred to as PINS) is an executive agency of the Department for Levelling Up, Housing and Communities of the United Kingdom Government with responsibility for making decisions and providing recommendations and advice on a range of land use planning-related issues across England. The Planning Inspectorate deals with planning appeals, nationally significant infrastructure projects, planning permission, examinations of Local Plans and other planning-related and specialist casework.

History 
The Planning Inspectorate traces its roots back to the Housing, Town Planning Act 1909 and the birth of the planning system in the UK. John Burns (1858–1943), the first member of the working class to become a government Minister, was President of the Local Government Board and responsible for the 1909 Housing Act. He appointed Thomas Adams (1871–1940) as Town Planning Assistant – a precursor to the current role of Chief Planning Inspector.

Subsequent Acts have included the Housing and Town Planning Act 1919, the Town Planning Act of 1925, the Town and Country Planning Acts of 1932, of 1947 and of 1990.

Between 1977 and 2001 the inspectorate was based in Tollgate House, Bristol before moving to its current headquarters at Temple Quay House, Bristol.

The National Planning Policy Framework (Community Involvement) Bill 2013-14 proposed to abolish the Planning Inspectorate.

On 9 May 2019, in a Written Statement, the Welsh Government (WG) signalled its intention to establish a separate, dedicated Planning Inspectorate for Wales due to the ongoing divergence of the regimes in England and Wales. On 01 October 2021, the staff and functions of Planning Inspectorate for Wales transferred to Welsh Government. The new division is called Planning and Environment Decisions Wales.

Organisation
The Inspectorate is headquartered at Temple Quay House in Bristol. 

The Inspectorate employs salaried staff and also contracts non-salaried Inspectors (NSIs).

Planning inspectors, appointed by the Secretary of State and said 'to stand in the shoes of the Secretary of State', are given power by Schedule 6 to the Town and Country Planning Act 1990 and the Town and Country Planning (Determination of Appeals by Appointed Persons) (Prescribed Classes) Regulations 1997 (SI 1997/420) to determine the appeals which are mostly against refusals of local planning authorities to grant planning permission.

The Inspectorate operates under primary legislation for the appeals system, which is the Town and Country Planning Act (TCPA) 1990 (as amended), the Planning Act 2008 (as amended) which covers the consenting regime for National Infrastructure projects. The Local Plans system is covered by the Planning and Compulsory Purchase Act 2004. Frameworks established by related legislation cover other areas of work such as Environmental appeals and Rights of Way casework.

The Planning Inspectorate has three primary roles:
to help communities shape where they live;
to operate a fair and sustainable planning system; and
to help meet future infrastructure needs.

See also
 Planning and Environment Decisions Wales, for similar functions in Wales
 Scottish Executive Inquiry Reporters' Unit, for similar functions in Scotland
 Planning Appeals Commission, for similar functions in Northern Ireland

References

External links
The Planning Inspectorate
Appeals Casework Portal
National Infrastructure Planning

Department for Levelling Up, Housing and Communities
Executive agencies of the United Kingdom government
Interested parties in planning in England
Interested parties in planning in Wales
Organisations based in Bristol
Regulators of England
Regulators of Wales